Fred William Hooper (October 6, 1897 – August 4, 2000) was an American Thoroughbred racehorse owner and breeder. He was a member of The Jockey Club, an honorary director of the Breeders' Cup, and one of the founders of the Thoroughbred Owners and Breeders Association and one of its first presidents.

Early years
Born in Cleveland, Georgia,  Hooper quit school in the eighth grade and worked as a schoolteacher, a carpenter, a riveter, a prizefighter and a potato farmer. He would make his fortune in the heavy construction business. He bought  near Montgomery, Alabama and started breeding champion Hereford cattle and eventually horses. He later built the Circle H Farm, an  horse breeding operation in Ocala, Florida.

Thoroughbred Racing
Hooper won the 1945 Kentucky Derby with his first thoroughbred, Hoop Jr. In his 50 years as a horse-breeder, Hooper bred or raced the winners of more than one hundred stakes races. Among his other notable horse were U.S. Racing Hall of Fame inductees Precisionist and Susan's Girl.

In 1975 and again in 1982, Fred Hooper was voted the Eclipse Award for Outstanding Breeder. In 1992, he was voted the Eclipse Award Of Merit, the industry's highest honor. In 1995 he was inducted in the Calder Race Course Hall of Fame.

Fred Hooper was responsible for bringing top Latin American riders to the United States. Hall of Fame jockeys Laffit Pincay Jr., Braulio Baeza, and Jorge Velásquez all got their start with him.

Death
Hooper died at the age of 102 in Ocala, Florida. The Fred W. Hooper Handicap at Gulfstream Park is named in his honor.

See also

References

 
 Bowen, Edward L. Legacies of the Turf: A Century of Great Thoroughbred Breeders (2003) Eclipse Press 

1897 births
2000 deaths
American centenarians
Men centenarians
American racehorse owners and breeders
Owners of Kentucky Derby winners
Eclipse Award winners
People from Cleveland, Georgia